Moon Tae Chain Twin Nay Win The is a 1982 Burmese black-and-white drama film, directed by Kyaw Hein starring Kyaw Hein, Cho Pyone, Moht Moht Myint Aung and Khin Khin Thite.

Cast
Kyaw Hein as Ko Wyne
Cho Pyone as Kha Yay
Moht Moht Myint Aung as Ma Phyu
Khin Khin Thite as Khin Khin Thite
May Thit as Daw May Thit

Awards

References

1982 films
1980s Burmese-language films
Films shot in Myanmar
Burmese black-and-white films
1982 drama films